Seyfarth Shaw LLP is an international AmLaw 100 law firm headquartered in Chicago, Illinois. Founded in Chicago in 1945 by Henry Seyfarth, Lee Shaw, and Owen Fairweather, Seyfarth Shaw originally focused on  the area of labor and employment law. Today, the firm’s clients include over 300 of the Fortune 500 companies, and its practice reflects virtually every industry and segment of the economy. 

Seyfarth Shaw has been recognized as one of the most innovative law firms in the nation for its implementation of "Seyfarth Lean," a unique client service model that combines the principles of Lean Six Sigma with robust technology, knowledge management, process management techniques, alternative fee structures, and practical tools. Seyfarth has been consistently ranked as one of the most recommended law firms in BTI Consulting Group's Annual Survey of General Counsel.  Seyfarth was also named among the top five law firms in BTI Consulting Group's 2015 "Client Service A-Team" ranking, which identifies the top law firms for client service through a national survey of corporate counsel.

Rankings
The American Lawyer ranks Seyfarth 60th in its annual AmLaw 100 ranking of the largest U.S. law firms by revenue. The  National Law Journals "NLJ 250" list ranks Seyfarth 50th among the largest law firms in the United States. Top Legal 500, U.S. News & World Report, and Chambers  rank Seyfarth as one of the best law firms in the United States in numerous practice areas.

History
Seyfarth Shaw was founded in Chicago in 1945 by attorneys Henry Edward Seyfarth, Lee Charles Shaw, and Owen Fairweather. Seyfarth graduated from the University of Illinois in 1928 and two years later received his J.D. degree from the University of Chicago Law School. Lee Shaw enrolled at the University of Michigan, where he played football as an offensive and defensive lineman alongside future President Gerald Ford. He completed his undergraduate degree at the University of Chicago in 1936 and two years later earned his J.D. degree at the university's law school. The third founding partner, Owen Fairweather, earned his undergraduate degree from Dartmouth College and then graduated cum laude from the University of Chicago Law School in 1938.

After World War II ended in August 1945, Shaw and Fairweather returned to Chicago from their stint with the National War Labor Board and together with their senior colleague, Seyfarth, set up a boutique law firm specializing in labor law. In 1947, Lee Shaw helped draft the Taft-Hartley Act. 
Also in July 1947 the firm filed the first strike damage suit in U.S. District Court in Chicago against the United Steelworkers of America. In the 1960s Seyfarth represented the Las Vegas casinos during their labor negotiations. The firm would plant the firm's flag further westward in the early 1970s, taking on Cesar Chavez and his United Farm Workers on behalf of growers. In the late 1970s, Seyfarth became very successful in its work to break the walkout of United Steelworkers at Newport News Shipbuilding and the pressmen's strike at the Washington Post. As a result, the firm garnered the antipathy of organized labor. Seyfarth also maintained something of a notorious image in the 1980s, fanned by its work in 1984 with Yale University and the attempt to break a new clerical union.
In 2002, Seyfarth Shaw joined Ius Laboris, an international alliance of labor lawyers. The firm left the alliance in 2008.

References 

Law firms based in Chicago
Law firms established in 1945
1945 establishments in Illinois